Stanislav Valeryevich Timchenko (born 11 January 1983) is a Russian former competitive figure skater. He is the 2002 Skate Canada International bronze medalist, 2002 World Junior bronze medalist, and 2001 ISU Junior Grand Prix Final champion. He retired from competition in 2004 and performed with Igor Bobrin's Ice Miniature Theatre in 2008.

Programs

Results
GP: Grand Prix; JGP: Junior Grand Prix

References

External links
 
 

1983 births
Russian male single skaters
Living people
Figure skaters from Moscow
World Junior Figure Skating Championships medalists
Competitors at the 2001 Winter Universiade